"An American Trilogy" is a 1972 song medley arranged by country composer Mickey Newbury and popularized by Elvis Presley, who included it as a showstopper in his concert routines. The medley uses three 19th-century songs: 
"Dixie" — a popular folk song about the southern United States.
"The Battle Hymn of the Republic" — a marching hymn of the Union Army during the American Civil War; and
"All My Trials" — a Bahamian lullaby related to African American spirituals and widely used by folk music revivalists

First performances
Newbury first recorded "An American Trilogy" for his 1971 album Frisco Mabel Joy, and the medley featured prominently on his first concert album, Live at Montezuma Hall, released in 1973. The studio recording reached No. 26 on the charts in 1972, and No. 9 on Billboard's Easy Listening chart. Newbury's version was used for nightly TV sign offs for KTBS, KLFY & WRBT in the mid to late 1970s.

Presley began singing "An American Trilogy" in concert in January 1972; a live recording made the following month was released as a single by RCA Records. Presley modifies Newbury's sequence by reprising after "All My Trials" both "Dixie" (in the solo flute) and with a bigger ending on "Battle Hymn". He performs the medley in the 1972 concert film Elvis on Tour. Presley's version didn't equal the US chart success of Newbury's single, reaching No. 66 late in 1972 and peaking at No. 31 on the Easy Listening chart. However, it was included in both versions of the widely-seen 1973 satellite telecast Aloha from Hawaii. Presley's recording was more successful in the UK, where it reached No. 8.

Recent versions

In 2002 the medley was covered by heavy metal band Manowar, appearing as the sixth track on the album Warriors of the World. It was also featured on country singer Billy "Crash" Craddock's live album Live -N- Kickin' in 2009. Alwyn Humphreys' arrangement for male choir is popular and features on albums by the Cardiff Arms Park Male Choir and Morriston Orpheus Choir. "An American Trilogy"  is referenced and partially sung in the Manic Street Preachers' "Elvis Impersonator: Blackpool Pier" on the Everything Must Go album. It was also arranged for the Royal Philharmonic Orchestra for the 2015 compilation album, If I Can Dream. In all, over 465 versions have been recorded by various artists.

Charts
Mickey Newbury

Elvis Presley

Certifications

References

Further reading
Collins, Ace. Songs Sung, Red, White, and Blue: The Stories Behind America's Best-Loved Patriotic Songs.  HarperResource, 2003.  

1971 songs
1972 singles
Elvis Presley songs
American patriotic songs
Elektra Records singles
RCA Victor singles
Songs about the American South
Music medleys
Trilogies
Song recordings produced by Felton Jarvis